Heidsee (Romansh: Igl Lai) is a lake at Lenzerheide, Grisons, Switzerland.

It lies at the foot of the Parpaner Rothorn.

See also
List of mountain lakes of Switzerland

External links
Lenzerheide  Tourism information

Lakes of Switzerland
Reservoirs in Switzerland
Lakes of Graubünden
LHeidsee
Vaz/Obervaz